Chitinophaga is a genus of bacteria from the family of Chitinophagaceae.

Species
The following species are validly published:

Chitinophaga agri Lee et al. 2020
Chitinophaga alhagiae Zou et al. 2019
Chitinophaga arvensicola (Oyaizu et al. 1983) Kämpfer et al. 2006
Chitinophaga aurantiaca Kim et al. 2019
Chitinophaga barathri Zhang et al. 2015
Chitinophaga caeni Jin et al. 2018
Chitinophaga caseinilytica Dahal and Kim 2018
Chitinophaga costaii Proença et al. 2014
Chitinophaga cymbidii Li et al. 2013
Chitinophaga deserti Kong et al. 2019
Chitinophaga dinghuensis Lv et al. 2015
Chitinophaga eiseniae Yasir et al. 2011
Chitinophaga filiformis (Reichenbach 1989) Kämpfer et al. 2006
Chitinophaga extrema Goh et al. 2020
Chitinophaga flava Lv et al. 2019
Chitinophaga ginsengihumi Lee and Whang 2014
Chitinophaga ginsengisegetis Lee et al. 2007
Chitinophaga ginsengisoli Lee et al. 2007
Chitinophaga humicola Chaudhary and Kim 2018
Chitinophaga japonensis (Fujita et al. 1997) Kämpfer et al. 2006
Chitinophaga jiangningensis Wang et al. 2014
Chitinophaga longshanensis Gao et al. 2015
Chitinophaga lutea Zong et al. 2019
Chitinophaga niabensis Weon et al. 2009
Chitinophaga niastensis Weon et al. 2009
Chitinophaga oryziterrae Chung et al. 2012
Chitinophaga parva Ke et al. 2018
Chitinophaga pinensis Sangkhobol and Skerman 1981
Chitinophaga polysaccharea Han et al. 2014
Chitinophaga qingshengii Cheng et al. 2015
Chitinophaga rhizosphaerae Kim et al. 2017
Chitinophaga rupis Lee et al. 2009
Chitinophaga sancti (Lewin 1969) Kämpfer et al. 2006
Chitinophaga sedimenti Li et al. 2017
Chitinophaga silvisoli Wang et al. 2019
Chitinophaga skermanii Kämpfer et al. 2006
Chitinophaga solisilvae Ping et al. 2020
Chitinophaga taiwanensis Lin et al. 2014
Chitinophaga terrae Kim and Jung 2007
Chitinophaga tropicalis Zhang et al. 2020
Chitinophaga varians Lv et al. 2018
Chitinophaga vietnamensis Tran et al. 2020

References

Chitinophagia
Bacteria genera
Taxa described in 1981